Bereket is a village in Gülnar district of  Mersin Province, Turkey. At  it is situated in the mountainous area to the west of Gülnar. The population of Bereket was 429 as of 2012.

References

Villages in Gülnar District